CD160 antigen is a protein that in humans is encoded by the CD160 gene.

CD160 is a 27 kDa glycoprotein which was initially identified with the monoclonal antibody BY55. Its expression is tightly associated with peripheral blood NK cells and CD8 T lymphocytes with cytolytic effector activity. The cDNA sequence of CD160 predicts a cysteine-rich, glycosylphosphatidylinositol-anchored protein of 181 amino acids with a single Ig-like domain weakly homologous to KIR2DL4 molecule. CD160 is expressed at the cell surface as a tightly disulfide-linked multimer. RNA blot analysis revealed CD160 mRNAs of 1.5 and 1.6 kb whose expression was highly restricted to circulating NK and T cells, spleen and small intestine. Within NK cells CD160 is expressed by CD56dimCD16+ cells whereas among circulating T cells its expression is mainly restricted to TCRgd bearing cells and to TCRab+CD8brightCD95+CD56+CD28-CD27-cells. In tissues, CD160 is expressed on all intestinal intraepithelial lymphocytes. CD160 shows a broad specificity for binding to both classical and nonclassical MHC class I molecules.

Clinical significance 

CD160 is a ligand for HVEM, and considered a proposed immune checkpoint inhibitor with anti-cancer activity along with anti- PD-1 antibodies. CD160 has also been proposed as a potential new target in cases of human pathological ocular and tumor neoangiogenesis that do not respond or become resistant to existing antiangiogenic drugs.

Related gene problems
TAR syndrome
1q21.1 deletion syndrome
1q21.1 duplication syndrome

See also
 Cluster of differentiation

References

Further reading

External links
 
 

Clusters of differentiation